Quasimellana eulogius, the common mellana, is a species of grass skipper in the butterfly family Hesperiidae.

The MONA or Hodges number for Quasimellana eulogius is 4068.

References

Further reading

External links

 

Hesperiinae
Articles created by Qbugbot